Terry Perdue (10 November 1940 – 19 August 1998) was a British weightlifter. He competed at the 1968 Summer Olympics and the 1972 Summer Olympics.

Perdue was a scrap dealer in Swansea who was arrested along with two other men and charged with the theft of 41,000 pounds of metal in 1971. He was sentenced to four years in prison but was acquitted on appeal after serving nine months, just in time to join the British Olympic team for the 1972 Games. He was one of the weightlifters featured in the Mai Zetterling-directed segment The Strongest in Visions of Eight. He was described by Robert H. Boyle in the October 8, 1973 issue of Sports Illustrated as "bearded, stuffs 320 pounds into a six-foot frame and could be played in a film by Peter Ustinov."

References

External links
 

1940 births
1998 deaths
British male weightlifters
Olympic weightlifters of Great Britain
Weightlifters at the 1968 Summer Olympics
Weightlifters at the 1972 Summer Olympics
Sportspeople from Swansea
Commonwealth Games medallists in weightlifting
Commonwealth Games silver medallists for Wales
Commonwealth Games bronze medallists for Wales
Weightlifters at the 1970 British Commonwealth Games
Weightlifters at the 1974 British Commonwealth Games
20th-century British people
Medallists at the 1970 British Commonwealth Games
Medallists at the 1974 British Commonwealth Games